Orestes Júnior Alves (born 24 March 1981 in Lavras, Minas Gerais), known simply as Orestes, is a Brazilian former professional footballer who played as a centre-back.

References

External links

1981 births
Living people
People from Lavras
Brazilian footballers
Association football defenders
Campeonato Brasileiro Série A players
Santos FC players
Primeira Liga players
Liga Portugal 2 players
C.F. Os Belenenses players
Vitória F.C. players
F.C. Maia players
C.D. Santa Clara players
Associação Naval 1º de Maio players
Bundesliga players
2. Bundesliga players
FC Hansa Rostock players
Damash Gilan players
Super League Greece players
Veria F.C. players
Qatar Stars League players
Al-Arabi SC (Qatar) players
Al-Shahania SC players
Saudi Professional League players
Al-Shoulla FC players
Brazilian expatriate footballers
Expatriate footballers in Portugal
Expatriate footballers in Germany
Expatriate footballers in Iran
Expatriate footballers in Greece
Expatriate footballers in Qatar
Expatriate footballers in Saudi Arabia
Brazilian expatriate sportspeople in Portugal
Brazilian expatriate sportspeople in Germany
Brazilian expatriate sportspeople in Greece
Brazilian expatriate sportspeople in Qatar
Sportspeople from Minas Gerais